Roger Federer was the defending champion, but was eliminated by Tomáš Berdych in the semifinals.
Novak Djokovic won the title, defeating Berdych in the final, 7–5, 6–3.

Seeds

Draw

Finals

Top half

Bottom half

Qualifying

Seeds

Qualifiers

Draw

First qualifier

Second qualifier

Third qualifier

Fourth qualifier

References
 Main Draw
 Qualifying Draw

Dubai Tennis Championships - Singles
2013 Men's Singles